This is an incomplete list of all military confrontations that have occurred within the boundaries of the modern U.S. State of Illinois since European contact.

References

Battles
Illinois